Olga is an unincorporated community located in Russell County, Kentucky, United States.

The post office was transferred to what now is called "Olga" from nearby Old Olga in the 1920s; the post office closed permanently in 1941.

References

Unincorporated communities in Russell County, Kentucky
Unincorporated communities in Kentucky